The winners of the Star Screen Awards for Best Screenplay are listed below:

See also
 Bollywood
 Cinema of India
 Screen Awards

Screen Awards